Malekiyeh-ye Olya (also Romanized as Mālekīyeh-ye ‘Olyā; also known as Mālekīyeh and Mālekīyeh-ye ‘Olyā Mashrūţeh) is a village in Howmeh-ye Sharqi Rural District, in the Central District of Dasht-e Azadegan County, Khuzestan Province, Iran. At the 2006 census, its population was 2,031, in 359 families.

References 

Populated places in Dasht-e Azadegan County